List of the National Register of Historic Places listings in Essex County, New Jersey


This is intended to be a complete list of properties and districts listed on the National Register of Historic Places in Essex County, New Jersey. The locations of National Register properties and districts (at least for all showing latitude and longitude coordinates below) may be seen in an online map by clicking on "Map of all coordinates".

Historic resources in the Montclair, New Jersey area were surveyed in 1986, leading to a number of separate listings.

|}

Former listings

|}

See also
National Register of Historic Places listings in New Jersey
List of National Historic Landmarks in New Jersey

References

Essex
History of Newark, New Jersey